Lajbook (also spelled Lajbouk) is a village and union council of the Lower Dir District in the Khyber Pakhtunkhwa province of Pakistan.

See also

External links

Khyber-Pakhtunkhwa Government website section on Lower Dir
United Nations

Lower Dir District
Union Councils of Lower Dir District